The Family Circus (originally The Family Circle, also Family-Go-Round) is a syndicated comic strip created by cartoonist Bil Keane and, since Bil's death in 2011, is currently written, inked, and rendered (colored) by his son, Jeff Keane. The strip generally uses a single captioned panel with a round border, hence the original name of the series, which was changed following objections from the magazine Family Circle. The series debuted on February 29, 1960, and has been in continuous production ever since. According to publisher King Features Syndicate, it is the most widely syndicated cartoon panel in the world, appearing in 1,500 newspapers. Compilations of Family Circus comic strips have sold over 13 million copies worldwide.

Characters

Family
The central characters of Family Circus are a family whose surname is rarely mentioned (although the cartoon of August 26, 2013, in which Billy refers to "Grandma Keane" and "Grandma Carne" indicates the same surnames as the author's family). The parents, Bil and Thelma (Thel), are modeled after the author and his wife, Thelma Carne Keane. Their four children, Billy, Dolly, Jeffy, and P.J., are fictionalized composites of the Keanes' five children. With the exception of P.J., no characters have aged appreciably during the run of the strip.

Bil (named Steve in the early years of the strip) works in an office, and he is believed to be a cartoonist, most likely based on the writer of the strip because he draws big circles on paper, presumably a cartoon version of the Family Circus. Some panels refer to Bil as a veteran of World War II.

Thel is a college-educated homemaker. The Los Angeles Times ran a feature article on the Thelma character when Keane updated her hairstyle in 1996.

The eldest child is 7-year-old Billy. A recurring theme involves Billy as a substitute cartoonist, generally filling in for a Sunday strip. The strips purportedly drawn by Billy are crudely rendered and reflect his understanding of the world and sense of humor. The first use of this gag by Keane was in This Week magazine in 1962 in a cartoon titled "Life in Our House" which attributed the childish drawings to his 6-year-old son, Chris. Keane also modeled Billy after his eldest son Glen, now a prominent Disney animator.

The character of 5-year-old Dolly was modeled after Keane's daughter and eldest child, Gayle. Dolly was a nickname that Thelma Keane called little girls.

The character of 3-year-old Jeffy was named and modeled after Keane's youngest child, Jeff.

The comic family's youngest child P.J. (Peter John) was introduced into the strip through a series of cartoons about the Family Circus Mommy's pregnancy, which culminated in the baby's birth on August 1, 1962. P.J. grows to be about one year old, and rarely speaks.

Extended family
Bil's mother (Florence, but usually called Grandma) appears regularly in the strip and apparently lives near the family. Bil's father (Al, called Granddad by the kids and Bil) is dead but occasionally appears in the strip as a spirit or watching from up in heaven. Bil's father (as a spirit) plays a prominent role in the TV special A Family Circus Christmas. Al died after the launch of the feature. However, on November 25, 2012, reference is made to his having died before Jeffy was born even though the character Al was featured in strips prior to his Granddad's death.

Thel's parents are both alive but apparently live several hundred miles away in a rural area. Strips in the past have mentioned them living in Iowa, but one 2007 strip mentioned Florida. The family occasionally visits them for vacation.

Pets
The family pets are two dogs—a Labrador named Barfy and a shaggy-haired mutt named Sam, a stray the children brought home on January 26, 1970—and an orange tabby cat named Kittycat.

Other characters
 Morrie is a playmate of Billy, and the only recurring black character in the strip. Keane created the character in 1967 as a tribute to his close friend Morrie Turner, creator of Wee Pals.
 Mr. Horton is Bil's boss.

Location
The Family Circus takes place in Scottsdale, Arizona. They often visit a popular ice cream parlor named the Sugar Bowl (based on the actual same-named restaurant which features many strips signed by Keane), and Jeffy once went to St. Joseph's Hospital for a tonsillectomy. Thel was seen playing tennis with a racket marked "Scottsdale Racket", and Bil mentioned moving up to B class at Scottsdale Racket Club in a 1984 strip. Also, a sign for Paradise Valley, where Bil Keane lived the latter part of his life, is seen in one 1976 strip. Sometimes the family is depicted enjoying snow at their home in the strip, whereas Scottsdale gets very little snow in the winter. Bil Keane commented that he took aspects of his boyhood in Pennsylvania, such as snow, and added them to the strip.

Themes

Religion
One distinguishing characteristic of the Family Circus is the frequent use of Christian imagery and themes, ranging from generic references to God to Jeffy daydreaming about Jesus at the grocery store. Keane states that the religious content reflects his own upbringing and family traditions. Keane was Roman Catholic, and in past cartoons the children have been shown attending Catholic schools with sisters as teachers and attending Catholic church services, much as Keane did in his childhood years at St. William Parish in Philadelphia. Keane was a frequent contributor to his high school newspaper, The Good News, at Northeast Catholic High School for Boys in Philadelphia, Pennsylvania where he graduated in 1940. Some of his comics with scenes in Billy's bedroom depict an NC pennant hanging on the wall, a tribute to his alma mater and his Catholic education.

Billy the Substitute Cartoonist
Sometimes Keane's strips would have crude drawings purportedly done by "Billy, Age 7". Some of "Billy's" drawings would be explaining vocabulary, only he does not understand the right word, such as confusing "hysterical" with "historical" or defining "acquire" as "a group of singers in church". Oftentimes the "Billy" drawings would show a more detailed drawing of Keane's, such as Billy crying over losing a game to his father, then the next strip saying "This is what really happened, by Billy", showing the crude drawing of Billy winning and an annoyed Bil Keane storming off saying "No more games, I gotta draw Sunday's cartoon!" One series of strip for the dailies in 1990 had the father off on a business trip, whereas "Billy" explains a multitude of childish reasons for his absence, such as alien abduction or being baked into a witch's pie. The story arc ended with a Keane drawing showing the father back home and the kids asking about such preposterous happenings, to the dad's befuddlement.

Dotted lines
One of the best-known features of Keane's work is the dotted line comics, showing the characters' paths through the neighborhood or house with a thick dotted line. The earliest appearance of the dotted line was on April 8, 1962 (an un-dotted path had first appeared on February 25). This concept has been parodied by other comic strips, including Pearls Before Swine, For Better or For Worse, FoxTrot, Calvin and Hobbes, Garfield, Liō, Marvin, and xkcd. In an interview, Jeff Keane, who now produces the strip, described how he creates the line: by drawing one continuous black line and then breaking it into segments with white. The dotted line has taken on different formats, such as when the family took a vacation to San Francisco and showed them in a dotted line down the famous Lombard Street ("the crookedest street in the world"), or Jeffy and his grandfather taking a walk in the park, where Jeffy is shown running around pell-mell marked by a squiqqly dotted line, as opposed to a long rigid dotted line marking his granddad's, who stayed on the path. Other strips would show the dotted line with captions, such as when Billy used the restroom when the family was at a pancake house, with captions of Billy's lingering ("helps busboy pick up pieces of broken plate", "finds quarter in payphone", "uses quarter to play at an arcade cabinet").

Gremlins
In April 1975, Keane introduced an invisible gremlin named "Not Me", who watches while the children try to shift blame for a misdeed by saying, "Not me." Additional gremlins named "Ida Know" (in September 1975), "Nobody," "O. Yeah!," and "Just B. Cause" were introduced in later years. Although it is clear that the parents do not accept the existence of the gremlins, they did include them as members of the family, perhaps tongue-in-cheek, when being interviewed by a member of the U.S. Census Bureau. Another time when Thel was sick of hearing about the gremlins from the kids ("Who's been rummaging in Gramma's purse?" "Not me!"), she asked her mother-in-law if she ever dealt with such absurdity, causing Florence to remark, "Well, I'm sure that he has been around at least since I was a little girl," in which there is a flashback to Florence's childhood with her father demanding to know, "Who scratched my new Glenn Miller record?," with little Florence firmly stating, "Not me!", and the "Not Me" entity smugly standing by.

Grown children
One theme Keane tried from time to time was picturing the children as adults, or what might come of it. One time when Billy had been asked by Thelma not to leave the house until he finished his homework, she told him, "One day when you are grown up you will thank me for this!," causing Billy to imagine the absurdity of himself as a full grown man paying a visit to his elderly mother just to thank her for telling him that as a child. Other adult ideas included the parents telling Jeffy not to be shy when they invited friends over, and then he is pictured 25 years later as an outgoing late night talk show host akin to Jay Leno. Another example was P.J. not wishing to be introduced to the toddler daughter of family friends, only to show 30 years later that both are now grown and are celebrating their wedding day. Yet another had Thel telling Billy she cannot clean up after him his whole life, then imagining a full-grown Billy as a businessman running a chain of "High Hat Hotels", and an aged, weary Thel working as one of the maids.

Family car
For the first 25 years, the family car was a station wagon, first based on Keane's own 1961 Buick. In 1985, a year after the introduction of the Plymouth Voyager and the Dodge Caravan, the family appears in a series of cartoons trading in the station wagon for a new minivan (when the salesman assures Mom and Dad that "Lee Iacocca stands behind every vehicle we sell," the children scuttle around and look behind the van to see if Mr. Iacocca is back there). The family's minivan resembles Dodge/Plymouth twins and includes the Chrysler corporate pentastar logo on its hood. The children enjoy showing off the new van to their friends: "And it has a sliding door, like an elevator." Early strips also showed the family in a small convertible, a caricature based on Keane's Sunbeam Rapier.

Format

Daily strip
The daily strip consists of a single captioned panel with a round border. The panel is occasionally split in two halves. One unusual practice in the series is the occasional use of both speech balloons within the picture and captions outside the circle. The daily strip does not generally follow a weekly story arc, with the exception of family vacations.

Sunday strip
The format of the Sunday strip varies considerably from week to week, though there are several well-known recurring themes. One recurring theme is a single picture surrounded by multiple speech balloons, representing the children's response to a given scenario, although the speaker of any given speech balloon is never explicitly shown (this format began on May 30, 1965).

Other media

Book collections
There are 89 compilations of Family Circus cartoons. For a full list of book titles, see Family Circus collections.

Television
The Family Circus characters appeared in animated form in three television holiday specials, all broadcast on NBC:
A Special Valentine with the Family Circus (1978),
A Family Circus Christmas (1979),
A Family Circus Easter (1982).The Easter special featured jazz musician Dizzy Gillespie as the Easter Bunny. This special is a musical and features Dolly singing "Hey There, Easter Bunny".

Feature film
In October 2010, 20th Century Fox and Walden Media announced that they had acquired the film rights for a live-action feature film based on the Family Circus cartoon. Nichole Millard and Kathryn Price have been hired to adapt the comic strip as a live-action project.

Video game
An educational video game was released for home computers in 1992. Called Our House featuring the Family Circus (a.k.a. Now and Then), the game compares life in modern times to those when the parents, grandparents and other ancestors of the comic were young.

Parodies
The Family Circus has been widely satirized in film, television, and other daily comic strips. In an interview with The Washington Post, Keane said that he was flattered and believed that such parody "...is a compliment to the popularity of the feature..." The official Family Circus website contains a sampling of syndicated comic strips from other authors which parody his characters.

Some newspaper comic strips have devoted entire storylines using Family Circus characters. In 1994, the surreal Zippy the Pinhead comic strip made multiple references to the Family Circus, including an extended series during which the titular character, a pinhead, sought "Th' Way" to enlightenment from Bil, Thel, Billy, and Jeffy. Bil Keane was credited as "guest cartoonist" on these strips, drawing the characters exactly as they appear in their own strip, but in Zippy's world as drawn by Zippy creator Bill Griffith. Griffith described the Family Circus as "the last remaining folk art strip." Griffith said, "It's supposed to be the epitome of squareness, but it turns the corner into a hip zone."

For the 1997 April Fools' Day comic strip switcheroo, Dilbert creator Scott Adams swapped cartoons with Keane; and Stephan Pastis drew a series in which Family Circus "invaded" Pearls Before Swine in 2007. Pastis, who had a close relationship with Bil and Jeff Keane, created numerous parodies of Family Circus "because it was an icon."

The Dysfunctional Family Circus was a satire website which paired Keane's illustrations with user-submitted captions. Keane claimed to have found the site funny at first. However, disapproving feedback from his readership, coupled with the website's use of double entendre and vulgarity, prompted Keane to request that the site be discontinued.

The webcomic Jersey Circus is a mashup of artwork from The Family Circus and dialogue from the reality show Jersey Shore. It juxtaposes the innocent artwork of the comic with the often adult dialogue from the show to parody both media phenomena.

The 1999 novel The Funnies, by J. Robert Lennon, centered around a dysfunctional family whose late patriarch drew a cartoon similar to The Family Circus. Lennon later said, although there was a "resemblance", he did not "know anything about Bil Keane and made up my characters from scratch."

The cartoon has been the subject of gags on many television sitcoms including episodes of Pinky and the Brain, Mystery Science Theater 3000, The Simpsons, Drawn Together, Robot Chicken, Mad, an episode of Family Guy ("Dog Gone") and the 1999 movie Go.

In the Diary of a Wimpy Kid book and film series, the main character and his dad share a common dislike "for the lameness of a Family Circus knockoff comic."

Some Pearls Before Swine strips include appearances by the Family Circus characters or parodic Family Circus strips. In one series of strips, Rat is captured by Family Circus fans after poking fun at the Family Circus. In the week of June 27, 2005, Stephan Pastis portrayed the cartoon Keane family inviting Osama bin Laden into their house. Bin Laden is captured by the police while following Billy's dotted lines, and the whole family is imprisoned at Guantanamo Bay for harboring a terrorist.

The 2016 graphic novel The Fun Family by Benjamin Frisch tells the dark story of the family of the creator of a Family Circus-like strip.

References

External links

 The Family Circus Official Homepage
 The Family Circus at King Features
 The Family Circus at Don Markstein's Toonopedia. Archived from the original on June 27, 2016.
 Bil Keane Cartoons 1954–1966 at Syracuse University (primary source material)

1960 comics debuts
American comics characters
American comic strips
Arizona in fiction
Comic strips set in the United States
Comics about married people
Christian comics
Fictional characters from Arizona
Fictional families
Gag cartoon comics
Gag-a-day comics